Llanstephan Halt railway station, in Llanstephan, Powys, Wales, was opened by the Great Western Railway on 6 March 1933. The nameboard stated Llanstephen Radnor Halt. It was closed by British Railways on 31 December 1962.

References

Further reading

Disused railway stations in Powys
Railway stations in Great Britain opened in 1933
Railway stations in Great Britain closed in 1962
Former Great Western Railway stations
1962 disestablishments in Wales